Københavns Badminton Klub (KBK) is a badminton club in Copenhagen, Denmark. It is one of the oldest and largest badminton clubs in the country and has won the Danish Badminton League 18 times.

History
Københavns Badminton Klub was founded in 1928. The club dominated the Danish team tournament which was introduced in 1950 until the mid-1970s. The club was for many years based at Randersgade 21 (Rothesgade 12) but moved to new premises in Krausesvej after a fire in December 1991.

Today
The club has around 700 members. Its badminton hall is located at Krausesvej 12 in Østerbro. Michael Kjeldsen has been head coach of the elite teams since 2014.

Achievements

Danish Badminton League

Champion: 1952–53, 1953–54, 1954–1955, 1955–56, 1957–58, 1958–1959, 1959–60, 1960–61, 1961–1962, 1962–63, 1963–64, 1965–66, 1967–68, 1969–70,1970–71,  1971–72, 1972–73, 1973-74

Notable players
 Erland Kops

References

External links
 Official website

Badminton clubs in Copenhagen
Sports clubs established in 1928
1928 establishments in Denmark